Paddy Morrissey (born 1955) is an Irish retired Gaelic footballer who played for the Tipperary senior team.

Born in Bansha, County Tipperary, Morrissey first arrived on the inter-county scene at the age of seventeen when he first linked up with the Tipperary minor team before later joining the under-21 and junior sides. He joined the Tipperary senior panel during the 1976 championship. Morrissey subsequently became a regular member of the starting fifteen.

At club level Morrissey is a three-time championship medallist with Galtee Rovers.

Morrissey retired from inter-county football following the conclusion of the 1984 championship.

In retirement from playing Morrissey became involved in team management and coaching. He served as a selector with the Tipperary minor and junior teams before taking charge of the senior team as manager.

Honours

Player

Galtee Rovers
Tipperary Senior Football Championship (3): 1976, 1980, 1981

References

1955 births
Living people
Galtee Rovers Gaelic footballers
Tipperary inter-county Gaelic footballers
Gaelic football managers
Gaelic football selectors